Alison Barbara Ratcliffe (born 10 October 1934) is an English former cricketer who played as a right-handed batter and right-arm leg break bowler. She appeared in four Test matches for England in 1960 and 1961, all against South Africa. She mainly played domestic cricket for Kent, as well as one match for East Anglia.

References

External links
 
 

1934 births
Living people
England women Test cricketers
People from Bacup
Kent women cricketers
East Anglia women cricketers